Clear Run is a historic rural crossroads community located on the Black River at Clear Run, Sampson County, North Carolina.  The community includes 22 contributing buildings and 6 contributing sites. Notable contributing resources include the Marvin Johnson House (c. 1898), Federal Herring House (1830s), the Colonial Revival style A. J. Johnson House (1909), Clear Run Grocery, furniture store (c. 1870), cotton gin, and the remains of the steamer A. J. Johnson.

It was added to the National Register of Historic Places in 1986.

References

Buildings and structures on the National Register of Historic Places in North Carolina
Colonial Revival architecture in North Carolina
Houses completed in 1898
Buildings and structures in Sampson County, North Carolina
National Register of Historic Places in Sampson County, North Carolina